Demetrios, later renamed Michael, Doukas Komnenos Koutroules Angelos was the third son of the ruler of Epirus, Michael II Komnenos Doukas (ruled 1230–68), also surnamed Koutroules, and his wife Theodora of Arta.

In 1278, he married Anna Komnene Palaiologina, the daughter of the Byzantine emperor Michael VIII Palaiologos (r. 1259–82), and received from his father-in-law the supreme dignity of Despot. From this marriage, he had two sons, Andronikos and Constantine. From a second marriage to a daughter of George I Terter, Tsar of Bulgaria, he had several children more.

He is mentioned as fighting in the ranks of the Byzantine army against the troops of Charles of Anjou in the Siege of Berat, as well as twenty years later against the Alans. In 1304, he was accused of conspiring against Emperor Andronikos II Palaiologos (r. 1282–1328) and was imprisoned. Nothing further is known of him.

References

Sources 
 

13th-century births
14th-century deaths
13th-century Byzantine people
14th-century Byzantine people
Byzantine military personnel
Despots (court title)
Demetrios
Byzantine prisoners and detainees
Prisoners and detainees of the Byzantine Empire
Year of birth unknown
Year of death unknown